In music, a chorale prelude or chorale setting is a short liturgical composition for organ using a chorale tune as its basis. It was a predominant style of the German Baroque era and reached its culmination in the works of J.S. Bach, who wrote 46 (with a 47th unfinished) examples of the form in his Orgelbüchlein, along with multiple other works of the type in other collections.

Function
The precise liturgical function of a chorale prelude in the Baroque period is uncertain and is a subject of debate. One possibility is that they were used to introduce the hymn about to be sung by the congregation, usually in a Protestant, and originally in a Lutheran, church.  This assumption may be valid for the shorter chorale preludes (Bach's setting of 'Liebster Jesu, wir sind hier, BWV 731, for example), but many chorale preludes are very long.  It could be the case that these were played during extended ceremonial in church or in cathedrals.

Style
Chorale preludes are typically polyphonic settings, with a chorale tune, plainly audible and often ornamented, used as cantus firmus. Accompanying motifs are usually derived from contrapuntal manipulations of the chorale melody.

Notable composers of chorale preludes during the Baroque period include Dieterich Buxtehude, Johann Pachelbel and Johann Sebastian Bach. Examples also exist from the late 19th century, including works by Johannes Brahms and Max Reger.

Baroque period

Among the old masters who wrote chorale preludes is Samuel Scheidt. His Tabulatura Nova, containing several such works, was published in 1624. Sweelinck is also typical of the early Baroque period.

Chorale preludes also appear in the works of Dieterich Buxtehude and Georg Böhm. Over 40 chorale preludes by Buxtehude have survived to this day.

Johann Pachelbel's compositions are another example of the form, with many of his chorale preludes elaborating upon Protestant chorale melodies.

The best-known composer of chorale preludes is Johann Sebastian Bach. His earliest extant compositions, works for organ which he possibly wrote before his fifteenth birthday, include the chorale preludes BWV 700, 724, 1091, 1094, 1097, 1112, 1113 and 1119.

In Bach's early Orgelbüchlein (1708-1717), the chorale melody is usually in the upper part and the accompanying lower parts, while being highly elaborate in their harmonic and contrapuntal detail, the beginnings and endings of phrases generally coincide with those of the chorale.  An example is "Jesu, meine Freude", where the chorale melody in the upper part is supported by a closely woven and harmonically subtle counterpoint in three parts:

Peter Williams (1972, p. 27) says of the Orgelbüchlein: “Each approach to Bach’s organ chorales – their beauty, their ‘symbolism’, their mastery- is rewarding.”   Williams continues (1972, p29) “One of the most remarkable features of most of the settings is that the accompaniment and the motifs from which it is composed are newly invented and are not related thematically to the melody.”

"The achieving of a melody independent of the cantus firmus, though in principle it is familiar in obbligato arias, is here unusually complete." Julian Mincham (2010) sees an asymmetry here that is possibly rooted in the chorale itself “with its slightly puzzling mixture of different phrase lengths”:

Two melodic ideas from the chorale, labelled (a) and (b) above are embedded in the obbligato line:

Mincham says that while “theme and chorale are not designed to begin and end together… [they] fit together perfectly. Get to know the chorale and ritornello melodies well and the apparently effortless ways in which they inter-relate will become obvious. The important point is that they seem not to fit; but they do.”

Romantic period and twentieth century

There are several examples of 19th- and 20th-century chorale preludes, such as the Eleven Chorale Preludes by Johannes Brahms, César Franck, Max Reger's and Samuel Barber's. Works such as these continue to be produced nowadays such as Helmut Walcha's four volumes and the seven volumes of Flor Peeters.

Johannes Brahms
See Eleven Chorale Preludes.

Max Reger
Reger composed, among others, 52 chorale preludes, Op. 67, Chorale Preludes for Organ, Op. 79b (1900–04) and 30 small chorale preludes, Op. 135a (1914).

See also
Chorale composition

References

17th-century music genres
18th-century music genres
19th-century music genres
20th-century music genres
Baroque music
Classical church music
Romantic music
Preludes (music)